Haizea is a feminine given name of Basque origin meaning "wind". It was among the 10 most popular names given to newborn girls in Basque Country, Spain in 2012. Hayzu is a variant of the name.

Notes

Basque feminine given names
Feminine given names